The Dove Award for Worship Album of the Year is presented by the Gospel Music Association of the United States. The category was first introduced as Praise and Worship Album of the Year at the  12th GMA Dove Awards in 1981, and since then is presented annually. Worship Album of the Year is presented to the artist (if prominent on the album) and the producer (if other than the artist).

Recipients

1980s

1990s

2000s

2010s

2020s

References

General

Specific

External links
 Dove Awards website

GMA Dove Awards
Album awards